Killagh is a civil parish in County Westmeath, Ireland.

Killagh is one of 7 civil parishes in the barony of Delvin in the Province of Leinster.

Killagh civil parish comprises six townlands, and the neighbouring civil parishes include: Killulagh to the north, Killucan to the south and Rathconnell (barony of Moyashel and Magheradernon) to the west.

References

External links
Killagh civil parish at the IreAtlas Townland Data Base
Killagh civil parish at townlands.ie
Killagh civil parish at The Placename Database of Ireland

Civil parishes of County Westmeath